Rendezvous in New York is an album by American pianist Chick Corea that was released on April 22, 2003 by Corea's label, Stretch Records. The recording took place at the Blue Note Jazz Club in New York City over the course of three weeks. Corea reunited with members from nine bands that he played with in the past. Musicians included Terence Blanchard, Gary Burton, Roy Haynes, Bobby McFerrin, Joshua Redman, Gonzalo Rubalcaba, and Miroslav Vitous.

Track listing

Disc 1
 "Armando's Rhumba" (Chick Corea) – 4:58
Chick Corea – piano
Bobby McFerrin – vocals
 "Blue Monk" (Thelonious Monk) – 5:34
Chick Corea – piano
Bobby McFerrin – vocals
 "Concierto de Aranjuez/Spain" (Joaquín Rodrigo, Corea) – 8:14
Chick Corea – piano
Bobby McFerrin – vocals
 "Matrix" (Corea) – 10:47
Chick Corea – piano
Roy Haynes – drums
Miroslav Vitous – bass
 "Glass Enclosure/Tempus Fugit" (Bud Powell) – 16:10
Chick Corea – piano
Joshua Redman – tenor saxophone
Terence Blanchard – trumpet
Christian McBride – bass
Roy Haynes – drums
 "Crystal Silence" (Corea, Neville Potter) – 10:01
Chick Corea – piano
Gary Burton – vibraphone
 "Bessie's Blues" (John Coltrane) – 8:37
Chick Corea – piano
Dave Weckl – drums
John Patitucci – bass

Disc 2
 "Autumn Leaves" (Joseph Kosma, Johnny Mercer, Jacques Prévert) – 11:35
Chick Corea – piano
Dave Weckl – drums
John Patitucci – bass
 "Armando's Tango" (Corea) – 12:10
Chick Corea – piano
Avishai Cohen – bass
Jeff Ballard – drums
Steve Wilson – alto saxophone
Steve Davis – trombone
Tim Garland – tenor saxophone
 "Concierto de Aranjuez/Spain" (Rodrigo, Corea) – 13:25
Chick Corea – piano
Gonzalo Rubalcaba – piano
 "Lifeline" (Corea) – 12:02
Chick Corea – piano
Avishai Cohen – bass
Jeff Ballard – drums
 "Quartet No. 2, Pt. 1" (Corea) – 11:42
Chick Corea – piano
Michael Brecker – tenor saxophone
Eddie Gómez – bass
Steve Gadd – drums

Personnel 
 Chick Corea – piano
 Terence Blanchard – trumpet
 Steve Davis – trombone
 Steve Wilson – alto saxophone
 Michael Brecker – tenor saxophone
 Tim Garland – tenor saxophone
 Joshua Redman – tenor saxophone
 Gary Burton – vibraphone
 Gonzalo Rubalcaba – piano
 Christian McBride – bass
 Eddie Gómez – bass
 Avishai Cohen – bass
 John Patitucci – bass
 Miroslav Vitous – bass
 Jeff Ballard – drums
 Steve Gadd – drums
 Roy Haynes – drums
 Dave Weckl – drums
 Bobby McFerrin – vocals

Chart performance

References 

2003 albums
Chick Corea live albums
Stretch Records albums
Albums recorded at the Blue Note Jazz Club